Fullmetal Alchemist is a manga series created by Hiromu Arakawa

Fullmetal Alchemist may also refer to:
Edward Elric, the title character of the series
Fullmetal Alchemist (TV series), the first televised adaptation of the manga
Fullmetal Alchemist: Brotherhood, the second televised adaptation of the manga
Fullmetal Alchemist (film), a live-action film adapted from the manga